Kaviyoor C. K. Revamma (14 April 1930 in Kaviyoor – 13 May 2007 in Kollam) was a popular Carnatic vocalist. Revamma, who started learning Carnatic music at the age of eight, had her initiation into the career of a musician at Aruvipuram at the age of 16.

After securing the first rank in BA and MA degree (music) examinations, she received her PhD in music from Kerala University. Revamma was the first to get PhD in music from Kerala University. Later, she lectured at the women's college in Thiruvananthapuram, where she became the head of the department of Music. Revamma also served as principal of the Thrissur Government College and retired as deputy director, Collegiate Education.

Revamma sang in many films, including Jeevitha Nouka, Navalokam, Neelakuyil, Sasidharan, Ponkathir and Chechy. Her first film was Sasidharan. Revamma, P. Leela and Jikky (Krishnaveni) were known as the singing trio of Malayalam films of yesteryears. Revamma lent her voice for songs in about 20 Malayalam films in 1950s, including such musical hits as Jeevitha Nouka, Navalokam, Neelakuyil, Sasidharan, Ponkathir and Chechy. Her duet with A M Rajah mesmerised listeners with classic numbers like Nee en chandrane, njaan nin chandrika and Anputhan ponnambalthil from the movie Avan Marannu. Revamma later concentrated on teaching and research in music.

A holder of Ganabhushanam from the Thiruvananthapuram Music College, she also served as a member of the Board of Studies of Kerala, Calicut and MG universities. She taught at different colleges of the state. She conducted her postdoctoral studies in ethno-musicology at UCLA with a Fulbright scholarship. Revamma also served as a visiting professor at various universities in the United States. She received the Kerala Sangeetha Nataka Akademi Award in 1975.

References

 

1930 births
2007 deaths
Women Carnatic singers
Carnatic singers
Singers from Kollam
University of Kerala alumni
Malayalam playback singers
Singers from Kerala
20th-century Indian singers
Musicians from Kollam
Indian women classical singers
Indian women playback singers
Film musicians from Kerala
Women musicians from Kerala
20th-century Indian women singers
Recipients of the Kerala Sangeetha Nataka Akademi Award